Wet Lake is a ribbon lake in the Mrągowskie Lakeland of Poland.  There are 5 islands in the lake. It is situated in the Mazurski Landscape Park near Zgon.

Statistics
 Length: 7.7 km
 Width: 1.6 km
 Area: 846 ha
 Maximum depth: 51 m

Lakes of Poland
Lakes of Warmian-Masurian Voivodeship